Lake Township is a township in Harvey County, Kansas, United States.  As of the 2000 census, its population was 173.

Geography
According to the USGS, it contains one cemetery, Hunt. Greenfield Lake and Saucer Lake are within the township.

References

Further reading

External links
 Harvey County Website
 City-Data.com
 Harvey County Maps: Current, Historic, KDOT

Townships in Harvey County, Kansas
Townships in Kansas